The Ontario Student Classics Conference (OSCC) is an annual event committed to the promotion and appreciation of studies in Classics.  It is a four-day competition that occurs in early May at Brock University of St. Catharines, Ontario.  Initially, the Conference was established as an extension of the National Junior Classical League (NJCL) but has since expanded and grown to become one of the largest and most popular conferences in Ontario, with over 500 students attending each year from 15-20 schools.
The conference is dedicated to the study of Classics; students compete in over 100 academic, athletic, and creative competitions all based on aspects of Classical life.

In addition to competitions, students also participate in different classically themed events, one of these being the "Pompa" (Latin for "Parade").  For this event everyone is required to dressed appropriately in classical attire, namely togas, and line up with their school to parade around the campus before attending a celebratory banquet and awards ceremony.

The OSCC is not affiliated with the Ontario Classical Association (OCA).

Competitions

Academic contests
These competitions are designed to challenge students' knowledge of the cultures of Ancient Rome and Ancient Greece through the writing of a wide variety of contests.  Most contests are offered at three different levels: Junior, Intermediate and Senior.  The Greek Derivative and Greek Oral Reading tests only have two: Junior and Senior.  Quaerite Summa does not have levels.  Levels in some contests are determined by the years of language study while others are based on grade level or a combination of the two.  The Academic Pentathlon consists of all five of the 'cursus' contests where Pentathletes' total score is determined by their total score achieved in all five contests.

Athletic contests
The athletic competitions are modeled on the Ancient Olympic Games of Ancient Greece.  Most events are divided by age and gender.  The Relay Race, Slinging, the 50 meter freestyle race and the 100 meter freestyle race are divided only by gender.  Discus Ultimus and the Chariot Race are open to everyone together.

Creative contests
 
Students complete in a variety of creative events and competitions that feature the production of both ancient and modern art forms.  Listed below are each of these events; the number in parentheses following the event indicates how many entries each school may submit.  Also, the winner of the Best Costume event is awarded no points.

Awards
Listed below are the trophies for each of the various OSCC competitions, which are given in addition to ribbons recognizing the top 5 placements in each event.  University of Toronto Schools has won the Phyllis Morgan Trophy — generally considered the top prize — every year since 1996 (as of 2016); York Mills Collegiate Institute had won nine straight years before 1996.

Conferences by year
Listed below are the locations, hosts and themes for each of the past OSCC conventions (as of 2016).

References

External links

Ontario Classical Association
National Junior Classic League
American Classical League

Student organizations established in 1968
Recurring events established in 1968
Classical associations and societies
Architectural competitions
1968 establishments in Ontario
Brock University
Intellectual competitions
Youth sport in Canada
Visual arts competitions